Codeworks, LLC is a privately held U.S. software company that specializes in warehouse management systems and transportation management system software for the third-party logistics industry.

History

In the early 1990s, a consortium of Third-Party Logistics (3PL) warehousing operations sought a warehouse management system capable of supporting multi-million-square-foot operations. Rick DeShone was chosen to spearhead the development effort, and in 1995, the project was successfully implemented, leading to the formation of Codeworks, LLC.

As of 2009, Codeworks' customers span the following industries in 35 major U.S. cities:
Automotive
Alcoholic Beverages
Apparel
Building materials
Consumer Durables
Consumer Electronics
Consumer Goods
Corrugated Products
Detergents
Direct Sales
Document Management
Electronics
Farm, Lawn & Garden Equipment
Food, Food-Related & Beverage
General Merchandise
Glass
Grocery
Hardware
Health and Beauty Aids
Health Care
Home Appliances
Lumber
Manufacturers
OEM
Paper
Plastics
Retail
Roll Fabrics
Sporting Goods
Tapes
Wire

Our Warehouse and Transportation Management System (WTMS) products are suitable for a variety of warehousing operations and facilities, including:
Bonded
Contract
Dry Storage Refrigerated Public
Third-Party Logistics/3PL
Freight Brokers & Forwarders
Fulfilment Centres
Transportation
Vendor-Managed Inventory

Products

The warehouse management system was named Warehouse and Distribution Logistics System (WDLS) and made available to other warehouses. As customer needs continued to expand, an integrated transportation management system named Traffic was developed.

The warehouse and transportation management products are sold as all-inclusive systems. All modular options are included as core functionality and licensing is server-based.

Services

Business consulting (i.e., capacity reviews, resource management, disaster recovery planning, operating systems, network configuration, ROI calculation)
Business-specific application development
Installation and configuration (i.e., systems integration, electronic data interchange (EDI) mapping, and communications)
Training
Customer support

References

U.S. Dept. of Transportation article "Electronic Freight Management," Jan./Feb. 2009
Riggs Transport Interview, Dec. 22, 2008
ODW Logistics customer website
Varsity Logistics Partner website
Manta company listing

Business software companies
Privately held companies based in Ohio